The Sagebrush Troubadour is a 1935 American Western film directed by Joseph Kane and starring Gene Autry, Barbara Pepper, and Smiley Burnette. Written by Oliver Drake and Joseph F. Poland, the film is about two Texas Rangers traveling undercover as western troubadours in search of the killer of an old, half-blind man.

Plot
Texas Rangers Gene Autry (Gene Autry) and Frog Millhouse (Smiley Burnette) are traveling undercover as western troubadours in search of the killer of old, half-blind Frank Martin. Their only clues are a guitar string (the murder weapon) and Martin's horse Swayback that hold the key to finding the dead man's lost goldmine.

Following Frank Martin's funeral, Martin's granddaughter, Joan (Barbara Pepper), meets her uncle, John Martin, and Lon Dillon, who flirts with her. Lawyer Henry Nolan reads Martin's will, revealing that the deceased left John $5,000 and the remainder of the estate to Joan. John tells Joan that he suspects Gene of her grandfather's murder and persuades her to hold a masquerade dance to lure Gene into town.

Meanwhile, Gene learns that Martin was nearly blind and relied on his horse Swayback to guide him. By following Swayback, whom Lon, John, and Henry have all tried to buy, Gene discovers that Martin had indeed located a gold mine. Gene and Frog escape a trap set for them at the dance and save Joan when she is nearly strangled by another guitar string. Then Gene discovers that John's guitar is missing a string.

John and Pablo, who have uncovered Swayback's hiding place, find the mine and are followed by Henry, Lon, and Hank Polk. As they argue among themselves, Gene surprises them and reveals that he is a Texas Ranger assigned to the Martin murder case. By claiming that Frog is a fingerprint expert, Gene tricks Henry into admitting his guilt. Henry is then arrested by the sheriff, who is waiting in the mine according to Gene's instructions. Finally, Joan learns that Gene has recorded the deed to the mine in her name.

Cast
 Gene Autry as Gene Autry
 Barbara Pepper as Joan Martin
 Smiley Burnette as Frog Millhouse
 Fred Kelsey as Hank Polk
 J. Frank Glendon as John Martin
 Hooper Atchley as Henry Nolan
 Julian Rivero as Pablo
 Dennis Moore as Lon Dillon (as Denny Meadows)

Production

Filming locations
 Kernville, California, USA

Soundtrack
 "Way Out West in Texas" (Gene Autry) by Gene Autry and Smiley Burnette
 "On the Prairie" (Smiley Burnette) by Gene Autry
 "End of the Trail" (Gene Autry) by Gene Autry and Smiley Burnette
 "Hurdy Gurdy Man" (Smiley Burnette) by Tommy Gene Fairey
 "My Prayer for Tonight" (Smiley Burnette) by the party guests
 "Lookin' for the Lost Chord" (Smiley Burnette) by Smiley Burnette
 "I'd Love a Home in the Mountains" (Gene Autry, Smiley Burnette) by Gene Autry and Smiley Burnette
 "When the Moon Shines (on the Mississippi Valley)" (Gene Autry, Smiley Burnette) (instrumental) 
 "Someday in Wyoming" (instrumental)

References
Citations

Bibliography

External links
 
 
 

1935 films
1935 Western (genre) films
1930s Western (genre) musical films
American black-and-white films
Films directed by Joseph Kane
Republic Pictures films
Films produced by Nat Levine
American Western (genre) musical films
Films with screenplays by Joseph F. Poland
1930s English-language films
1930s American films